Pir Boz (also Romanized as Pīr Boz) is a village in Gifan Rural District, Garmkhan District, Bojnord County, North Khorasan Province, Iran. At the 2006 census, its population was 1,032, in 220 families.

References 

Populated places in Bojnord County